A super-oxidized solution (SOS), also known as anolyte solution and oxidative potential water, is an electrochemically processed solution made from water and sodium chloride (NaCl). They may be used during wound care. They are available under a few brand names including Microcyn and Microdacyn.

References 

Oxidizing agents